Hennesey is an American military comedy-drama television series that aired on CBS from 1959 to 1962, starring Jackie Cooper and Abby Dalton.

Cooper played a United States Navy physician, Lt. Charles W. "Chick" Hennesey, with Abby Dalton as Navy nurse Lt. Martha Hale. In the story line, they are assigned to the hospital at the U.S. Naval Station in San Diego, California.

Extended cast
 Jackie Cooper as Lt. (later Lt. Commander) Charles "Chick" Hennesey, M.D.
 Abby Dalton as Lt. (JG) Martha Hale, R.N.
 Roscoe Karns as Capt. (later Rear Admiral) Walter Shafer
 Henry Kulky as Chief Petty Officer Max Bronski
 James Komack as Harvey Spencer Blair, III, D.D.S.
 Arte Johnson as Seaman Shatz
 Herb Ellis as Dr. Dan Wagner
 Robert Gist as Dr. Owen King
 Stephen Roberts as Commander Wilker
 Harry Holcombe as William Hale
 Ted Fish as Chief Branman
 Frank Gorshin as Seaman Pulaski
 Norman Alden also as Seaman Pulaski

Episodes

Season 1: 1959–60

Season 2: 1960–61

Season 3: 1961–62

Guest stars

Actor and singer Bobby Darin was cast in the second episode (October 5, 1959) as "Honeyboy Jones". That same week Darin became famous with his version of the song, "Mack the Knife".

Prior to being cast as Opie Taylor on The Andy Griffith Show, child actor Ron Howard played "Walker", a little boy temporarily left in Hennesey's care in the 1959 episode "The Baby Sitter". Gary Hunley, another child actor, appeared in the same episode.

Charles Bronson, en route to a long film career, was cast twice as Lt. Cmdr. Steve Ogrodowski, a Navy intelligence officer.

Don Rickles was cast in the 1961 episode "Professional Sailor" as CPO Ernie Schmidt. From 1976 to 1978, Rickles played the lead with the same rank in the NBC military sitcom, C.P.O. Sharkey.

Bandleader Les Brown and His Band of Renown and comedian Soupy Sales appeared in separate episodes as themselves.

Other guest stars:

Raymond Bailey
Roy Barcroft
Gertrude Berg
Ken Berry
Bill Bixby
Jolene Brand
Charles Bronson
Jean Byron
Jack Carter
Jack Cassidy
Phyllis Coates
Ellen Corby
Yvonne Craig
Robert Culp
Sammy Davis, Jr.
Donna Douglas
James Franciscus
Robert Foulk
Bob Hastings
Marty Ingels
Vivi Janiss
Arch Johnson
Helen Kleeb
Ruta Lee
Jimmy Lydon
Doug McClure
Jaye P. Morgan
Ed Nelson
J. Pat O'Malley
Sue Randall
Stafford Repp
Chris Robinson
Mickey Rooney
Walter Sande
William Schallert
Johnny Seven
Olan Soule
Larry Storch
Dick Wessel
Grace Lee Whitney
Meg Wyllie

Production notes
The series theme tune by Sonny Burke was a jazzy hornpipe played by tuba and piccolo. Hennesey was also innovative for being the first series to employ what has since become a standard device in television: beginning the dialog and action of each episode during opening credits.

Cooper starred in, produced, and directed the series, drawing upon his real-life experience as a World War II Navy veteran and his continuing service for many years as an officer in the United States Naval Reserve. He was a former child actor who starred in the Our Gang comedies of the early 1930s and then moved into feature films.

Beginning in 1960, scriptwriter Richard Baer wrote 38 of Hennesey's episodes, which earned him an Emmy nomination.

For the series finale, "I, Thee Wed", broadcast on May 7, 1962, characters Chick and Martha were married following their series-long romance.

References

External links 

1959 American television series debuts
1962 American television series endings
1950s American comedy-drama television series
1960s American comedy-drama television series
Black-and-white American television shows
CBS original programming
English-language television shows
Military comedy television series
Television shows set in San Diego
Television series by CBS Studios
Television series about the United States Navy
Works set in hospitals